Ashley De Vere Campbell (29 September 1880 – 5 July 1943) was an Australian male tennis player who was active before World War I. He was born in Sydney and attended Newington College (1893–1898) where he was a noted cricketer. Campbell didn't play tennis until the age of eighteen and his game was heavily influenced by David Edwards who was a fellow Old Newingtonian. Campbell moved to Melbourne in 1903 and was winner of the 1910 and 1914 Australasian men's doubles championships. From 1929 until 1939 he lived In Europe, having been an executive of the Colonial Sugar Refining Company in Australia and New Zealand. Campbell became secretary of the Free French movement in Victoria, and was secretary of the Red Cross and an active member of the Alliance Française. He died in a hospital in East St Kilda, Victoria.

References

1880 births
1943 deaths
People educated at Newington College
Australasian Championships (tennis) champions
Australian Championships (tennis) champions
Australian male tennis players
Tennis players from Sydney
Wimbledon champions (pre-Open Era)
Grand Slam (tennis) champions in men's doubles